Alaska first required its residents to register their motor vehicles and display license plates in 1921, while still an organized incorporated territory of the United States. It was admitted to the Union as the 49th state in January 1959.

, plates are issued by the Alaska Department of Administration through its Division of Motor Vehicles. Only rear plates have been required for standard passenger vehicles since August 11, 2022. On vehicles with two license plates, only the rear plate is required to be stickered.

Passenger baseplates

1921 to 1952
No slogans were used on passenger plates during the period covered by this subsection.

1953 to present
The 1955 (dated 1956) issue was the first Alaska license plate that complied with these standards.

All plates issued since 1981 remain valid with proper validation.

Alternative passenger plates

1973 plate controversy

A new plate design was to have been introduced in 1973, featuring the state flag in the center of the plate and a new ABC 123 serial format. During 1972, nine thousand pairs of these plates were produced, but before they could be issued they were rejected by Governor William A. Egan, who objected to the use of dots rather than stars in the state flag. The plates were instead considered prototypes, with their elements being used on future plates: the revalidation sticker box in the top left corner was used on the 1974 and 1975 versions of the 1970 plate; the ABC 123 serial format was adopted in 1976; and the "Last Frontier" plates issued since 1981 have the state flag in the center (with stars).

These prototype plates are common enough to be easily found among license plate collectors.

Non-passenger and optional types
Alaska offers a variety of optional plates that motorists may display upon the payment of an additional fee as well as non-passenger plate types that are displayed on vehicles for specialized uses.

Discontinued

References

External links
 Alaska Division of Motor Vehicles—License Plate Information
 Alaska license plates, 1969–present
 Royce's Alaskan License Plates

Alaska
Transportation in Alaska
Vehicle registration